Marruecos is one of the forty subbarrios of Santurce, San Juan, Puerto Rico.

Demographics
In 2000, Marruecos had no permanent residents.

In 2010, Marruecos had a population of 9 and a population density of 90 persons per square mile.

See also
 
 List of communities in Puerto Rico

References

Santurce, San Juan, Puerto Rico
Municipality of San Juan